Protocadherin 11 X-linked, also known as PCDH11X, is a protein which in humans is encoded by the PCDH11X gene.

Function 

This gene belongs to the protocadherin gene family, a subfamily of the cadherin superfamily. The encoded protein consists of an extracellular domain containing 7 cadherin repeats, a transmembrane domain and a cytoplasmic tail that differs from those of the classical cadherins. The gene is located in a major X/Y block of homology and its Y homolog (PCDH11Y), despite divergence leading to coding region changes, is the most closely related cadherin family member. The protein is thought to play a fundamental role in cell–cell recognition essential for the segmental development and function of the central nervous system. Neuronal self-avoidance is intricately linked to protocadherin activity. It also plays a role in structural cell-to-cell adherence. Transcripts arising from alternative splicing encode isoforms with variable cytoplasmic domains.

Clinical significance 

In a genome-wide association study, the PCDH11X gene has been linked as a risk factor in late onset Alzheimer's disease, but other studies on different populations  could not confirm the initial association. The clinical significance of this gene is unclear, and the gene might play different roles in different population specific contexts.

References

Further reading